Psenocerus supernotatus is a species of beetle in the family Cerambycidae, and the only species in the genus Psenocerus. It was described by Say in 1823.

References

Desmiphorini
Beetles described in 1823
Monotypic beetle genera